12:51 may refer to:

 "12:51" (Krissy & Ericka song), 2012
 Twelve: Fifty One, an album by Krissy & Ericka, 2012
 "12:51" (The Strokes song), 2003

Date and time disambiguation pages